Point of Rocks is a mountain range in Kern County, California.

Its sandstone peaks were a landmark for travelers crossing the Antelope Valley on El Camino Viejo and a guide to the water to be found on their heights, at Las Tinajas de Los Indios.

Nearby to the southeast is the location of the Point of Rocks oilfield. The deepest oil well drilled in California was here in 1987. Its total depth: 24426 feet.

References 

Mountain ranges of Kern County, California
Mountain ranges of Southern California